Clifford John Ronning (born October 1, 1965) is a Canadian former professional ice hockey forward. He was selected by the St. Louis Blues in the seventh round of the 1984 NHL Entry Draft, 134th overall. During a National Hockey League (NHL) career that spanned 18 years, Ronning played for the Blues, Vancouver Canucks, Phoenix Coyotes, Nashville Predators, Los Angeles Kings, Minnesota Wild and New York Islanders.

Playing career
Ronning played minor hockey in Burnaby. He led his midget team to the 1982 Air Canada Cup, where they won the gold medal. Ronning was named Most Valuable player and led the tournament in scoring. Prior to being drafted, he played in the Western Hockey League for the New Westminster Bruins, displaying the same excellent scoring touch. In 1983–84, Ronning's draft year, he posted 136 points in 71 games, earning the Stewart "Butch" Paul Memorial Trophy as the league's rookie of the year. Due to his small stature (Ronning was 5'8"), he was not drafted until the seventh round, when the St. Louis Blues picked him 134th overall. The next season, he returned to New Westminster and accumulated an astonishing 197 points, establishing a WHL record (he was later surpassed by Rob Brown's 212-point season in 1986–87).  Accordingly, Ronning earned the WHL Most Valuable Player Award and the Bob Brownridge Memorial Trophy as the league's leading scorer. Recording just 20 penalty minutes, he was also named the Most Sportsmanlike Player.

After Ronning's record setting season, he joined the Canadian National Team, with whom he played for one and a half seasons.  During this stint, Ronning made his first appearance in the NHL with the Blues, playing five games in the 1986 Stanley Cup Playoffs. Ronning began the next season with the National Team again before joining the Blues for the remainder of 1986–87.

Ronning did not, however, find his full stride in St. Louis. He spent part of 1988–89 with the Blues' International Hockey League affiliate, the Peoria Rivermen, and played the entirety of the following season in Italy with HC Asiago. When he returned to the Blues in 1990–91, he was traded to his hometown team, the Vancouver Canucks in a five-player deal that sent him with Geoff Courtnall, Robert Dirk, Sergio Momesso and a fifth round draft pick (Brian Loney) in exchange for Garth Butcher and Dan Quinn.

Ronning quickly became a key element on the rapidly improving Canucks. In 1992–93, he posted a career-high 29 goals and 85 points. On April 15, 1993, in a game against the Los Angeles Kings, he nearly tied Brian Trottier's record for most points in a single period, notching 3 goals and 2 assists in the third (Trottier had six). The following season, Ronning helped the Canucks on their run to the 1994 Stanley Cup Finals, which they lost in seven games to the New York Rangers. He played the seventh game with a broken hand.

Spending another two seasons in Vancouver, Ronning became a free agent after the 1995–96 season and signed with the Phoenix Coyotes for their first season after moving from Winnipeg. Following just over two seasons in Phoenix, Ronning was dealt with Richard Lintner to the Nashville Predators for future considerations.

As he joined the Predators in their expansion year, he took on a leadership role with the fledgling Predators, who finished second-to-last in their first NHL season. In all four seasons with the Predators, Ronning led the team in scoring, twice exceeding 60 points. He played an important role in mentoring young players, such as David Legwand.

At the 2001–02 trade deadline, the Predators sent Ronning to the Los Angeles Kings, who expected him to help them in the playoffs. In the off-season, he was traded from Los Angeles to yet another recent expansion team, the Minnesota Wild in their third year. Ronning was a veteran presence and still an able scorer, recording 48 points, as the Wild reached the Western Conference Finals before being swept by the Mighty Ducks of Anaheim.

In 2003–04, Ronning signed with the New York Islanders, mostly playing as a powerplay specialist, recording 24 points in 40 games played. As the NHL lockout suspended play, Ronning was inactive the following season.  When the NHL resumed, Ronning announced his decision to retire on February 15, 2006. Cliff Ronning was involved in two of the most notable games of Patrick Roy's career. He played against Roy in the 1982 Air Canada Cup midget tournament. Ronning's team beat Roy's Sainte-Foy Gouverneurs, and it was the last game of Roy's midget career. On April 22, 2003, Ronning played for the Minnesota Wild, and played in Roy's final NHL playoff game.

Awards and achievements

Air Canada Cup Most Valuable Player - 1982
BCJHL Coastal Division First All-Star Team - 1983
WHL Rookie of the Year - 1984
 WHL West Second All-Star Team – 1984
WHL West First All-Star Team - 1985
WHL Most Valuable Player - 1985
Bob Brownridge Memorial Trophy (WHL leading scorer) - 1985
WHL Most Sportsmanlike Player - 1985

Records
WHL league record; most points in a season - 197 in 1984–85 (surpassed by Rob Brown; 212 points in 1986–87)

Personal life
Ronning and his wife, Ivana have four children; three daughters Taryn, Kristin and Carly and one son, Ty. Ronning returned to live in Vancouver after his retirement. He plays with the Old-timers' Hockey Challenge and coaches a spring hockey team, the Vancouver Selects. Ronning has participated in the research and development of a better hockey stick. In 2009, Cliff Ronning and Ron Kunisaki formed BASE Hockey Labs. President and Co-Founder Ron Kunisaki founded Innovative Hockey, Inc. in 1993 and built the industry's largest high-performance OEM supplier before selling to Warrior Hockey in 2005. 
Vice-President and Co-Founder Cliff Ronning heads up Base Hockey's Shooting Analysis and Custom Fitting protocol in Burnaby, British Columbia.

His son Ty was drafted by the New York Rangers in the seventh round of the 2016 NHL Entry Draft and as of 2022 plays as a forward for the Rangers' AHL affiliate Hartford Wolf Pack.

Career statistics

Regular season and playoffs

International

Transactions
June 9, 1984 - Drafted in the 7th round, 134th overall, by the St. Louis Blues
March 5, 1991 - Traded by St. Louis with Geoff Courtnall, Robert Dirk, Sergio Momesso and a 5th round draft pick (Brian Loney) to the Vancouver Canucks in exchange for Garth Butcher and Dan Quinn
July 1, 1996 - Signs with the Phoenix Coyotes as a free agent
October 31, 1998- Traded by Phoenix with Richard Lintner to the Nashville Predators for future considerations
March 16, 2002 - Traded by Nashville to the Los Angeles Kings for Jere Karalahti and a 4th round draft pick (Teemu Lassila)
June 22, 2002 - Traded by Los Angeles to the Minnesota Wild in exchange for a 4th round draft pick (Aaron Rome)
January 9, 2004 - Signs with the New York Islanders as a free agent
February 15, 2006 - Announces his retirement

See also
List of NHL players with 1000 games played

References

External links

1965 births
Living people
Canadian expatriate ice hockey players in Italy
Canadian ice hockey centres
Canadian people of Norwegian descent
Asiago Hockey 1935 players
Ice hockey people from British Columbia
Los Angeles Kings players
Minnesota Wild players
Nashville Predators players
New Westminster Bruins players
New Westminster Royals (BCHL) players
New York Islanders players
Peoria Rivermen (IHL) players
Phoenix Coyotes players
St. Louis Blues draft picks
St. Louis Blues players
Sportspeople from Burnaby
Vancouver Canucks players